Clare Smyth   (born 1978) is a Northern Irish chef. She is the Chef Patron of three Michelin starred Core by Clare Smyth which opened in 2017. Previously she was Chef Patron at Restaurant Gordon Ramsay from 2012 to 2016, won the Chef of the Year award in 2013, and achieved a perfect score in the 2015 edition of the Good Food Guide. Smyth has also appeared on television shows such as Masterchef and Saturday Kitchen. Smyth also notably catered at Prince Harry and Meghan Markle's 2018 wedding.

In 2017, Smyth opened her first restaurant, Core, in London. It was awarded three Michelin stars in the 2021 Michelin Guide, which made her the first Northern Irish woman to have a restaurant awarded three Michelin stars. Her second restaurant, Oncore, opened in Sydney in 2021.

Early life

Smyth grew up on a farm in County Antrim. She is the youngest of three children, of her father William, a farmer, and mother Doreen, who worked as a waitress at a local restaurant.

At the age of fifteen, Smyth held a job over a holiday period at a local restaurant, inspiring her to become a chef. She left school at sixteen to study catering at Highbury College in Portsmouth, Hampshire.

Culinary career

While at culinary college, Smyth served an apprenticeship at Grayshott Hall, Surrey. She left that post to work full-time at Terence Conran's restaurant at Michelin House, London. She followed this with a six-month period in Australia working for a catering company, and on her return to the UK she staged at a variety of restaurants including The Waterside Inn and Gidleigh Park. She worked at the restaurant of the St Enodoc Hotel in Rock, Cornwall, first as sous chef and then as head chef. While there, she won the title of Young Cornish Fish Chef of the Year.

In 2002, Gordon Ramsay offered Smyth a post at Restaurant Gordon Ramsay.
In 2007, she was announced as the new head chef of Restaurant Gordon Ramsay, becoming the first female chef in the United Kingdom to run a restaurant with three Michelin stars. Of the 121 British Michelin-starred restaurants at the time of her appointment, only seven had female head chefs. She had left Ramsay's restaurant to work for a year and a half in Alain Ducasse's Le Louis XV restaurant in Monaco, before returning once more to the UK to run the Chelsea-based restaurant. She took over from Simone Zanoni, who was heading to Versailles to open a new Gordon Ramsay restaurant.

In 2013, Smyth was named the Good Food Guide's 'National Chef of the Year'. Smyth was appointed Member of the Order of the British Empire (MBE) in the 2013 Birthday Honours for services to the hospitality industry.

Smyth was awarded a perfect ten score by the Good Food Guide of the UK's 2015.

She won the Chef Award at the 2016 The Catey Awards, previously won by her mentor Gordon Ramsay in 2000.

2016–2021: Core and Oncore 

Smyth left Restaurant Gordon Ramsay in 2016 to open her first solo restaurant, Core. Core opened in London's Notting Hill neighbourhood in July 2017. In April 2018, Core was named Best Restaurant at the GQ Food and Drink Awards.

Clare Smyth was named the World's Best Female Chef 2018 by the World's 50 Best Restaurants.

In 2018, Smyth appeared as a judge in the "UK" episode of The Final Table, season 1.

On 1 October 2018, Core was awarded two Michelin stars in the 2019 Michelin Guide. Core was awarded three Michelin stars in the 2021 Michelin Guide, which made her the first British woman to have a restaurant awarded three Michelin stars.

In 2021, it was reported that Smyth will open a restaurant in Sydney, Australia called Oncore in November 2021, and again in 2022. 

A review in Bloomberg described Oncore as "Sydney's best restaurant". Due to ongoing border restrictions to prevent the transmission of Covid-19, Smyth has not yet been able to work in Oncore. Writing in an email to the magazine, Smyth said, "We have kept the menu very close to Core for the time being, and it will evolve over time when I am able to be there, which will be soon.”

Personal life 

Smyth lives in Wandsworth with her husband, Grant, who works in finance.

References

External links

1978 births
People from County Antrim
Chefs from Northern Ireland
Living people
Women chefs
British chefs
Head chefs of Michelin starred restaurants
Members of the Order of the British Empire